Brocken station is the terminus on the summit of the Brocken, the highest mountain in the Harz in central Germany. It lies in the state of Saxony-Anhalt and is the end point of the Brocken Railway operated by the Harz Narrow Gauge Railways.

Location 

It is the highest railway station in Germany that is served by a railway without a rack system.

History 
The line to the Brocken was opened on 4 October 1898. The present station building was built in 1924 of granite. Initially trains only ran during the summer months due to the harsh winter weather conditions. Following the destruction in the final days of the Second World War the line to the Brocken was closed and only reopened again on 14 May 1949. From 1950 the station was also served in the winter. At that time station was very busy. In July 1960 it received 90,000 passengers.

With the construction of border defences between East and West Germany that ran close to the Brocken, public train services to the mountain ended on 13 August 1961. Brocken station acted as accommodation for the Border Troops of the GDR. In the period to 1987, only a few materiel goods trains called at the station. After the political changes following the fall of the Berlin Wall, the Brocken Railway was reopened in 1991 and Brocken station was once again used as a railway station.

Facilities 
A restaurant, ticket office and souvenir shop for the Harz Narrow Gauge Railway are located in the station building. The station is currently only served by scheduled services by the steam-hauled trains of the Harz Narrow Gauge Railway and is primarily a tourist facility.

References 

Wernigerode
Transport in the Harz
Railway stations in Saxony-Anhalt
Buildings and structures in Harz (district)
Railway stations in Germany opened in 1898